Cucciddati, also known variously as Buccellati, Italian fig cookies or Sicilian fig cookies, are fig-stuffed cookies traditionally served at Christmas time.

The outer cookie is pastry dough, covered with icing and typically topped with rainbow sprinkles. The filling generally consists of some combination of walnuts, dates, figs, honey, spices and orange or apricot jam. The pastry is rolled around the filling, and rolls are either cut into short tubes, or curved around to form a "bracelet".

The modern recipe for the cookie originated during the Muslim Rule of Sicily. However an older version of the cookie recipe was  recorded as far back as the Roman occupation of Sicily.

Variations
When ring-shaped, these may be known as Buccellati, meaning "little bracelets," and are a diminutive form of Buccellato, a larger fig-filled ring cake. The ingredients are as varied as the names the cookies are called by, apparently a function of the town or region in which they are made. Other towns call them "nucciddati" (nut cookies), "zucciddati", "ucciddati", "vucciddati" and as in Serradifalco, pucciddati. That town's version includes ground figs and dates, nuts, and orange rinds.

See also
 Fig bar
 List of cookies
 List of stuffed dishes

References

Cuisine of Sicily
Stuffed desserts
Christmas food
Cookies
Fig dishes